Arnie Pantoja is an American actor. He graduated from East Lake High School in Tarpon Springs, Florida in 2003. After attending Florida State University for a year, he moved to Los Angeles in 2004 to become a professional actor.

Filmography
Pantoja has appeared in several commercials and feature films.

Film

Anime

Western Animation

Live action TV series

Video games

References

External links
 
 

Living people
American male film actors
American male television actors
American male video game actors
American male voice actors
Male actors from Kansas City, Missouri
Year of birth missing (living people)
21st-century American male actors
People from Tarpon Springs, Florida
Actors from Pinellas County, Florida
Florida State University alumni